The young Korean American Network (yKAN) is a 501(c)(3) non-profit, non-partisan organization of 1.5 and 2nd generation Korean-Americans in the New York City area.  The organization consists primarily of young professionals from various job industries, as well as academic fields. Members volunteer their time to help promote and advance the Korean-American presence in American society.

History
The young Korean American Network started in 1989 and was officially inaugurated on August 30, 1990 as a 501(c)(3) non-profit, non-partisan organization. Their first president, Michael Han, was a founding member who sought to create the organization as a response to the lack of a networking hub for the Korean-American community in New York.

Since its inauguration, the organization has grown to over 800 members.

Mission and Objective
The organization's mission

... is to elevate Korean-American professionals by fostering educational programs, community service, and networking opportunities. Through these activities yKAN addresses the issues of our community and provides a forum for those who share common experiences and face similar challenges.

The organizations' objectives are to
 Create a professional network to facilitate the even exchange of ideas and common goals among all Korean American professionals
 Foster a professional Korean-American presence in our community by sponsoring educational programs and opportunities
 Promote social awareness and activism through community service
 Foster mutual understanding between Korean-Americans and other ethnic groups
 Promote greater opportunities for the current and future generations of all Korean Americans

Presidents

Media coverage
yKAN has appeared in the media various times, most notably for their community service events.  These appearances include the following:

May 9, 2011 - Bone Marrow and Stem Cell Recruitment Drive. Video from NY1
December 18, 2006 - Milal House Visit.  Article from Christian Daily
January 21, 2006 - Anna Erika Adult Home Visit.  Scanned article from The Korea Times
January 19, 2006 - Media Coverage of guest speaker, Minya Oh ("aka Miss Info"). Scanned article from The Korea Times
October 29, 2005 - Flu Shot Drive. Scanned article from The Korea Times
September 17, 2005 - Anna Erika Adult Home Visit. Scanned article from The Korea Times
March 21, 2005 - Milal House Visit.  Article from The Korea Times
February 15, 2005 - Tsunami Relief Fundraiser Event for the 2004 Tsunami that effected Southeast Asia. Article from The Korea Times
February 11, 2005 - Tsunami Relief Fundraiser Event for the 2004 Tsunami that effected Southeast Asia. Article from The Segye Times

External links
 yKAN website - official

Youth organizations based in New York City